Le Phare de Québec (English: The Quebec Lighthouse) was an approved project located on Laurier boulevard in the former city of Sainte-Foy within the borough of Sainte-Foy–Sillery–Cap-Rouge in Quebec City, Quebec, Canada.

The complex had 4 towers: Tour 1 at 250 metres and 65 floors, Tour 2 at 180 metres and 50 floors, Tour 3 at 110 metres and 30 floors, and Tour 4 at 60 metres and 17 floors. Tour 1 would have been the tallest building in Quebec and the tallest building in Canada east of Toronto. The 25,083 square-metre site sits on the former location of Hotel Governors, which was demolished in 2013. The total floor area of the complex was more than 186,000 square metres, consisting primarily of office, commercial, residential, and hotel space. The complex featured a 750-seat multimedia concert hall.

The construction of the complex has been controversial for the city's residents. Concerns include aesthetics, increased local wind speeds, and unfair competition with buildings in neighbouring boroughs due to the building's large floor space.

See also
List of tallest buildings in Quebec City
List of tallest buildings in Quebec

References

External links
Redevelopment plans for Sainte-Foy specific to the Le Phare project; Ville du Quebec

Proposed buildings and structures in Canada
Proposed skyscrapers in Canada
Buildings and structures in Quebec City